LPRC Oilers is a football club from Liberia based in Monrovia. Their home stadium is the Liberia Petroleum Refining Company. The LPRC Oilers have been a fixture in Liberian football since the late 1980s. The team is considered one of the better squads in Liberia.

Achievements
Liberian Premier League: 7

 1991, 1992, 1999, 2002, 2005, 2019, 2021.

Liberian Cup: 6
 1988, 1989, 1993, 1999, 2000, 2005.

Liberian Super Cup: 1
 2002.

President Cup: 2
 2015, 2019.

Performance in CAF competitions
CAF Champions League: 3 appearances
2006 – Preliminary Round
2020 – Preliminary Round
2022 –

 African Cup of Champions Clubs: 2 appearances
1992: Preliminary Round
1993: First Round

CAF Cup Winners' Cup: 5 appearances

1987 – First Round
1989 – Quarter-finals
1990 – First Round
1994 – Second Round
1999 – First Round
2019 - First Round

References

Football clubs in Liberia
Sport in Monrovia